Teslui is a commune in Olt County, Muntenia, Romania. It is composed of seven villages: Cherleștii din Deal, Cherleștii Moșteni, Comănița, Corbu, Deleni, Schitu Deleni and Teslui.

References

Communes in Olt County
Localities in Muntenia